"Walk Away (Remember Me)" is the second single from Paula DeAnda. It was released in the United States in November 2006 and features The D.E.Y., and was written by Ne-Yo and Christina Milian together with producers Stargate. The song is about feelings from an old relationship that have resurfaced once the protagonist has seen her ex's new girlfriend.

"Walk Away" reached number 18 on the US Billboard Hot 100 in the second week of January 2007 and number four on the Pop Songs chart, becoming DeAnda's first top-twenty single on the Hot 100 and her biggest hit to date. It spent a total of 22 weeks on that chart. The song also found moderate success in Australia, peaking at number 60 on the ARIA Singles Chart in March 2007. A solo version with without the rap was also edited for radio. Both the solo version and collaboration with The D.E.Y. were eventually certified gold in the United States.

Music video
In the music video, DeAnda is with her friends when she sees her old boyfriend with his new girlfriend. Then DeAnda and her old boyfriend make eye contact, and start to walk towards each other. As they are slowly walking, there are flashbacks to various moments in the past of DeAnda and her old boyfriend relating to the lyrics of the song. Once they finally reach each other, he touches her waist, DeAnda has a flashback of him flirting with another girl, implying to the viewers that they broke up because he cheated on her. Then DeAnda kisses him on the cheek and walks away with her friends.

Chart

Weekly charts

Year-end charts

Certifications and sales

Release history

References

2006 debut singles
2006 songs
Arista Records singles
The D.E.Y. songs
Music videos directed by Ray Kay
Paula DeAnda songs
Song recordings produced by Stargate (record producers)
Songs written by Christina Milian
Songs written by Mikkel Storleer Eriksen
Songs written by Ne-Yo
Songs written by Steve Kipner
Songs written by Tor Erik Hermansen